The Battle of Britain Monument in London is a sculpture on the Victoria Embankment, overlooking the River Thames, which commemorates the individuals who took part in the Battle of Britain during the Second World War.

It was unveiled on 18 September 2005, the 65th anniversary of the Battle, by Prince Charles and Camilla, Duchess of Cornwall, in the presence of many of the surviving airmen known collectively as "The Few", following the Royal Air Force Service of Thanksgiving and Rededication on Battle of Britain Sunday. This service is an annual event, the first of which took place in 1943 at St Paul's Cathedral and since has taken place in Westminster Abbey.

The monument was conceived by Bill Bond, founder of the Battle of Britain Historical Society, who was later appointed an MBE for his services to heritage. He was solely responsible for negotiating with the City of Westminster to secure the site of the monument, as well as appointing Donald Insall Associates as architects. He also formed the fundraising committee after raising over £250,000 through an appeal. The budget was £1.74 million which was funded in the main by private donations. Bill Bond appointed Lord Tebbit as chairman of the fundraising committee.

A walkway was cut obliquely through the middle of the structure, and is lined with panels of high relief sculpture in bronze depicting scenes from the Battle of Britain. The centrepiece is an approximately life sized sculpture of airmen scrambling for their aircraft during the battle. The outside of the monument is lined with bronze plaques listing 2,936 pilots and aircrew from 14 countries who took part in the battle on the Allied side. In July 2020, Ajax historian Martin Sugarman, lost a campaign to list one of the airmen, whose parents were born in Mandatory Palestine, as being “British-Israeli" or "British Palestinian”. A member of the London monument team advised that, with nearly 3,000 names on the memorial, there was “no prospect of post-unveiling correction”.

The sculptor of the monument is Paul Day. The statue was cast by Morris Singer, which is the oldest established fine art foundry in the world and has cast many prominent statues and sculptures in London and around the world, including the lions and fountains in Trafalgar Square.

See also
Air Forces Memorial

External links
Official site
The National Memorial to the Few at Capel-le-Ferne (Official The Battle of Britain Memorial Trust) 
BBC coverage of the unveiling of the monument, including video
Article by Plt Off Bottomley about the unveiling of the Monument in the Spirit of the Air publication by the RAF – page 4

References

2005 sculptures
Britain Monument, London
Bronze sculptures in the United Kingdom
Buildings and structures in the City of Westminster
Military memorials in London
Royal Air Force memorials
Tourist attractions in the City of Westminster
World War II memorials in England
Victoria Embankment